is a Japanese long-distance runner who specializes in the marathon race. She was born in Matsuyama, Ehime.

Achievements
All results regarding marathon, unless stated otherwise

Personal bests
5000 metres - 15:37.08 min (2000)
10,000 metres - 32:07.66 min (2005)
Half marathon - 1:09:36 hrs (1999)
Marathon - 2:22:46 hrs (2002)

References

marathoninfo

1976 births
Living people
People from Matsuyama, Ehime
Sportspeople from Ehime Prefecture
Japanese female long-distance runners
Japanese female marathon runners
Olympic female marathon runners
Olympic athletes of Japan
Athletes (track and field) at the 2004 Summer Olympics
Athletes (track and field) at the 2008 Summer Olympics
World Athletics Championships athletes for Japan
World Athletics Championships medalists
Japan Championships in Athletics winners